Tender Prey is the fifth studio album by Australian rock band Nick Cave and the Bad Seeds, released on 19 September 1988 on Mute Records. Produced by Flood, the album was recorded during several sessions over the course of four months in West Berlin—where the band were based at the time of its release—and London and dedicated to Fernando Ramos da Silva.

Details
The album opens with frontman Nick Cave's signature song, "The Mercy Seat," which has been subsequently played at almost all of the band's live performances since 1988, and was later covered by one of Cave's influences, Johnny Cash, on American III: Solitary Man (2000). "The Mercy Seat" was released as a single in May 1988 prior to the album's release and "Deanna" was released in September. On the CD version, the video mix of "The Mercy Seat" is also included as the last track.

Upon its release, Tender Prey received positive reviews and charted in the United Kingdom and Greece. However, the album failed to chart in either the band's native Australia or the United States Billboard charts. The album was remastered and reissued on 29 March 2010 as a collector's edition CD/DVD set and in October 2010. It was also listed in the book 100 Best Australian Albums, alongside The Boatman's Call (1997), in the Top 30.

Cave later said, "It was a nightmare, that record. It is reflective of a group - particularly myself - who was just writing songs and there was no larger idea behind it. Sometimes some of the group was there, sometimes they weren't. I hear bad production and I hear bad performances as well." Cave later admitted that the album, "was made at a difficult time in my life when things were spiralling out of control in a lot of areas."

In 2012, the album was added to the National Film and Sound Archive's Sounds of Australia.

Track listing
"The Mercy Seat" – 7:17
Nick Cave – vocals, Hammond
Blixa Bargeld – slide guitar
Mick Harvey – bass loops, piano, guitar, backing vocals
Roland Wolf – guitar
Thomas Wydler – drums
Strings – Gini Ball, Audrey Riley and Chris Tombling
"Up Jumped the Devil" – 5:16
Nick Cave – vocals
Blixa Bargeld – guitar, backing vocals
Mick Harvey – bass, xylophone, backing vocals
Kid Congo Powers – guitar
Roland Wolf – piano
Thomas Wydler – drums
"Deanna" – 3:45
Nick Cave – vocals, Hammond
Blixa Bargeld – guitar
Mick Harvey – drums, bass, acoustic guitar
Kid Congo Powers – guitar
"Watching Alice" – 4:01
Nick Cave – vocals, piano, harmonica
Mick Harvey – bass
Thomas Wydler – drums
Hugo Race – guitar
"Mercy" – 6:22
Nick Cave – vocals, vibes, harmonica
Blixa Bargeld – slide guitar, backing vocals
Mick Harvey – bass, backing vocals
Kid Congo Powers – guitar, backing vocals
Roland Wolf – piano
Thomas Wydler – drums
Hugo Race – backing vocals
"City of Refuge" – 4:48
Nick Cave – vocals, Hammond, harmonica
Blixa Bargeld – guitar
Mick Harvey – bass, acoustic guitar, percussion
Kid Congo Powers – guitar
Roland Wolf – organ
Thomas Wydler – drums
Backing vocals – The Bad Seeds & Friends
"Slowly Goes the Night" – 5:23
Nick Cave – vocals, Hammond
Blixa Bargeld – guitar
Mick Harvey – bass, xylophone, backing vocals
Roland Wolf – piano, organ
Thomas Wydler – drums
Ian Davis – backing vocals
"Sunday's Slave" – 3:40
Nick Cave – vocals, piano
Blixa Bargeld – guitar
Mick Harvey – acoustic guitar, drums, bass
"Sugar Sugar Sugar" – 5:01
Nick Cave – vocals
Mick Harvey – acoustic guitar, bass, percussion
Kid Congo Powers – guitar
Roland Wolf – piano
Thomas Wydler – drums
"New Morning" – 3:46
Nick Cave – vocals, piano, harmonica, tambourine
Blixa Bargeld – guitar, backing vocals
Mick Harvey – acoustic guitar, drums, bass, organ, backing vocals
"The Mercy Seat" (video mix) – 5:05 (CD only)

Note: Early issues of the CD version of the album had a track indexing issue in which "Sunday's Slave" and "Sugar Sugar Sugar" were indexed as the same track.

Personnel

Writing
 Tracks written by Nick Cave, except where noted.
 Track 1, 5, 9 & 11 (words: Cave, music: Cave / Mick Harvey)
 Track 2 (words: Cave, music: Cave / Harvey / Roland Wolf / Blixa Bargeld / Kid Congo Powers / Thomas Wydler)
 "Deanna" is loosely based on The Edwin Hawkins' Singers version of the hymn "Oh Happy Day". Subsequently, Cave issued an acoustic version of a medley of both songs. Hawkins' version was later issued on Original Seeds Vol. 1.
 "City of Refuge" is noted in the credit listing as being inspired by a Blind Willie Johnson song "I'm Gonna Run to the City of Refuge". This was later issued on Original Seeds Vol. 1.

Personnel
Nick Cave and the Bad Seeds
 Nick Cave – vocals, Hammond organ(1,3,6,7), harmonica (4–6), piano (4,8,10), tambourine (10), vibraphone (5)
 Mick Harvey – bass (2–10), backing vocals (1,2,5–7,10), acoustic guitar (3,6,8–10), drums (3,8,10), percussion (6,9), xylophone (2,7), guitar (1), bass loops (1), piano (1), organ (10)
 Blixa Bargeld – guitar (2,3,6–8,10), backing vocals (2,5,6,10), slide guitar (1,5)
 Roland Wolf – piano (2,5,7,9), organ (6,7), guitar (1), backing vocals (6)
 Kid Congo Powers – guitar (2,3,5,6,9), backing vocals (5,6)
 Thomas Wydler – drums (1,2,4–7,9), backing vocals (6)

Guests
 Hugo Race – backing vocals, guitar
 Gini Ball – strings
 Audrey Riley – strings
 Chris Tombling – strings
 Ian Davis – backing vocals

Chart positions

References

1988 albums
Nick Cave albums
Mute Records albums
Albums produced by Flood (producer)
Albums produced by Tony Cohen
Albums recorded at Trident Studios